Famaillá Department is a department located in the center-west of the Tucumán Province, Argentina. Its 2001 population was 30,951, mainly located in the east. The department’s economic base is agriculture. The National Agricultural Technology Institute (Spanish: Instituto Nacional de Tecnología Agropecuaria), commonly known as INTA, has one of its experimental stations in the area.  The Department seat is the city of Famaillá.

Geography
The Aconquija Range lies across its west portion whereas the plains extend toward the east. The Famaillá (central area), Colorado (north), and Caspichango (south) rivers are the most important waterways, the two latter ones forming the department’s natural boundaries with Lules, Leales and Monteros. Famaillá has a total area of  427 km².

Adjacent departments
Lules Department – north
Leales Department – east
Monteros Department – south and southwest
Tafí del Valle Department – west

Transportation infrastructure

Major highways
National Route 38
Tucuman Province Routes: 301 and 324. 

Departments of Tucumán Province